Sex trafficking in Japan is human trafficking for the purpose of sexual exploitation and slavery that occurs in the country. Japan is a country of origin, destination, and transit for sexually trafficked persons.

Japanese citizens, primarily women and girls, have been sex trafficked within Japan and to a lesser degree abroad. Foreign victims are sex trafficked into the country. Minors and persons from families in poverty are particularly vulnerable to sex trafficking. Sex trafficked victims are deceived, threatened, and forced into prostitution. Their passports and bank documents are often confiscated. Debt bondage is often employed. They suffer from physical and psychological trauma. A number contract sexually transmitted diseases from rape and live in generally poor condition. Some rescued victims face ostracization, depression, and or commit suicide. Online sextortion and the creation of coerced rape pornography are issues.

Male and female traffickers in Japan come from a wide range of backgrounds and every social class. Traffickers are often members of or facilitated by crime syndicates,
Sex trafficking is linked to Japan's entertainment and tourism industries, and women and girls are also trafficked to businesses catering to military servicemen and contractors in United States Forces Japan. Traffickers have used the internet websites, email, and apps to lure victims. Japanese nationals have engaged in cybersex trafficking.

The scale of sex trafficking in Japan is difficult to know because of the underground nature of sex trafficking crimes, the fact that only a small minority of cases are reported to the authorities, and other factors. The Japanese government has been criticized for its lacking anti-sex trafficking efforts and laws. Some Japanese officials have been accused of being apathetic about the issue.

Types

Exploitation of children
Girls, including runaways, are lured, coerced, or forced into prostitution in Japan. The creation and sale of child pornography in Japan is a pervasive problem.

Some Japanese students engage in or get drawn into  ("compensated dating") in Tokyo and other cities. Some JK businesses are thought to serve as a gateway to sexual exploitation in Japan. Some JK businesses offers "hidden options," and attract high school girls looking to earn extra money. Evidence suggests these dating activities are preparatory stages for potential forms of child prostitution and child abuse. Critics have charged that police do not do enough to protect the women who get drawn into this. According to the 2018 Trafficking in Persons Report, there were 137 JK business operations identified and non closed; 69 individuals arrested for being engaged in criminal activities surrounding the JK business.

Akihabara has been referred to as a hub for child sex trafficking.

False promises of work opportunities
Besides young Japanese women and girls, foreign women who work in or migrate to Japan are also vulnerable to sexual exploitation, especially those from Cambodia, Thailand, and the Philippines. These victims are often lured by false promises of work opportunities in Japan arrive on short-stay visas. Once they arrive in Japan, they are subsequently forced into sex work, however, their involvement in the adult entertainment industry are generally regarded as voluntary participants, whatever their circumstances. Because of the visa status, these foreign workers are reluctant to seek help from local authorities since they acknowledge the vise was not able to grant them legal working rights in Japan. Combined with factors such as psychological intimidation, language barriers, and cultural differences, foreign women are at a higher vulnerable position.

Modeling scams
Japanese citizens, in addition to foreign women, are deceived by malicious individuals who claim to be fashion model agents. The victims are then convinced to sign phony contracts, legally binding them to participate in prostitution and the production of pornography. If victims try to refuse, agents allegedly threaten that they will have to pay penalties, or they will reveal the videos to the victim's family. Victims are also forced to sign contracts through which they abandon certain legal rights, such as copyrights of the films in which they are portrayed.

Anti-sex trafficking efforts

Non-governmental organizations
Lighthouse: Center for Human Trafficking Victims, a non-profit organization based in Tokyo, works to rescue and aid sex trafficking victims in Japan, helping them to arrange legal counsel, shelter, and medical care. The organization has created and distributed materials to raise awareness about human trafficking, including a manga titled Blue Heart.

Colabo (Tokyo) conducts anti-sex trafficking efforts in the country.

Government response
Japanese authorities have taken law enforcement actions against adult and child sex trafficking. The Employment Security Act (ESA) and the Labor Standards Act (LSA) both criminalized forced labor, which protects mental and physical freedom of the workers and serves as a measure against sex trafficking. The "Act on Regulation and Punishment of Activities Relating to Child Prostitution and Pornography and the Protection of Children" criminalized engaging in commercial sexual exploitation of a child, including purchase or sale of children for the purpose of production of child pornography or prostitution. On March 29, 2016, a cabinet decision was made on "Regarding basic policies on activities relating to measures against sexual exploitation etc. of children". This decision was meant to eradicate the sexual victimization of children resulting from child prostitution and production of child pornography. The National Public Safety Commission has been designated to govern the overall measures against the sexual exploitation of children. The police also work closely together with the relevant ministries and authorities to crackdown child prostitution-related crimes. Seven major prefectures maintained ordinances banning JK businesses, prohibiting girls younger than 18 from working in compensated dating services, or requiring JK business owners to register their employee rosters with local public safety commissions.

References

Human trafficking in Japan
Human rights abuses in Japan
Child sexual abuse
Forced marriage
Forced prostitution
Organized crime activity
Japanese women
Society of Japan
Prostitution in Japan
Sex industry
Rape in Japan
Japan
Social issues in Japan
Slavery in Japan
Crimes against women
Violence against women in Japan
Women in Japan
Yakuza